Cha is a relatively uncommon family name in Korea. The Yeonan Cha clan is the only clan. The founding ancestor was Cha Hyo-jeon, son of Ryoo Cha-dal (류차달) (10th century AD). Most of the clan's members live in Gyeongsang, Hwanghae, and P'yŏngan provinces. In South Korea in 2000, there were 180,589 people named Cha. The  Chinese surname Che is also written in the same Chinese character.

Notable people with the surname                                                                                                                            
Cha Bum-kun, South Korean football manager and former player
Cha Du-ri, South Korean footballer
Cha Eun-woo (born as Lee Dong-min), South Korean singer, actor, and model, member of boyband Astro
Cha Gui-hyun, South Korean footballer
Cha Hak-yeon (stage name N), South Korean singer, member of boyband VIXX
Cha Hyun-ok (stage name Yuri), South Korean singer
Cha In-pyo, South Korean actor
Cha Jin-ho, South Korean wheelchair curler
Cha Jun-hwan, South Korean Olympic figure skater
Cha Seung-won, South Korean actor
Cha Sun-woo (stage name Baro), South Korean singer and rapper, member of boyband B1A4
Cha Tae-hyun, South Korean actor
Theresa Hak Kyung Cha, Korean-American novelist
Victor Cha, Korean-American academic, author, and former national foreign policy advisor

See also

Chal (name)
Char (name)
 Munhwa Ryu
 List of Korean family names

References 
 Dictionary of American Family Names, Oxford University Press,

External links
official website of headquarters of the Yeonan Cha clan meeting
A 2001 Korea Now article explaining the clan structure

Korean-language surnames